Thad Allen (born 1949) was a U.S. Coast Guard admiral. Admiral Allen may also refer to:

David Allen (Royal Navy officer) (1933–1994), British Royal Navy rear admiral
William Allen (Royal Navy officer) (1792–1864), British Royal Navy rear admiral

See also
John Allan (Canadian naval officer) (1928–2014), Canadian Forces vice admiral
Sir Thomas Allin, 1st Baronet (1612–1685), British Royal Navy admiral